Simon Mills is a television producer who started his career as a Producer on Truly, Madly, Deeply' and amongst others, was responsible for Above The Below.  He has produced Derren Brown on The Heist, Something Wicked This Way Comes, Trick Or Treat and The System as well as Death Wish Live, a week of live television stunts for Channel 4.  More recently, he has produced Don't Fuck With Cats: Hunting an Internet Killer as well as Vatican Girl: The Disappearance of Emanuela Orlandi, Paranormal Witness, No Man Left Behind and Fear City: New York vs The Mafia''.

External links
 
Derren Brown's Website
Derren Brown @ Channel4
Deathwish Live @ Channel 4

Living people
Year of birth missing (living people)